Graco Luis Ramírez Garrido Abreu (born 26 June 1949) is a Mexican left-wing politician affiliated with the Democratic Revolution Party (PRD) who was Governor of Morelos for the 2012–2018 term. He served in the upper house of Congress as senator representing the State of Morelos (2006–2012).

Personal life and education
Graco Ramírez holds a bachelor's degree in law from the National Autonomous University of Mexico (UNAM).  He is the son of a member of the Mexican armed forces.

He also is part of the group known as Toby's Club which is a group of prominent people that control most of the important projects in the state, the groups has: notaries, artists, judges, businessmen.

Political career
On several occasions, Ramirez stated that he was a leader of the student movement that culminated in the Tlatelolco massacre of October 2, 1968; at least one leader has challenged this assertion.

Graco Ramírez began his political career as an Institutional Revolutionary Party (PRI) member; he served as president of the PRI in Tabasco. He then became a founder and member of the Socialist Worker's Party, the Mexican Socialist Party and the Party of the Democratic Revolution.

As the leader of the Morelos state legislature in 1995, Graco Ramirez led the first of several marches against then-governor Jorge Carrillo Olea because of alleged ties to drug trafficking and kidnapping. Carrillo was forced to resign in 1998.

Graco Ramírez has served more than one term in the lower house of Congress. In 2006 he was elected senator, hence he served in the upper house of Congress during the LX and LXI Legislatures (2006–2012). As senator, he promoted laws to allow independent candidates and citizen initiatives and consultations.

Graco Ramirez was elected Governor of Morelos in 2012. As governor, Ramirez was known as a progressive who supported women's rights and scholarships for needy students. In an effort to combat high crime rates in the state, Graco initiated a police reform program called Mando Unico wherein all the state and local police forces were united under a single command. Despite a promising start, both poverty and crime increased in the state; the "Mando Unico" in particular was accused of numerous human rights violations, and it was seen as a political organism. In 2016 an audit of the state university, UAEM revealed a shortfall of millions of pesos. Governor Ramirez and Alejandro Vera, the rector of the university, mutually accused one another of deviating funds for other purposes. Faced with the loss of their pensions, faculty and staff went on strike; a student march was supported by the Catholic bishop, Ramon Castro Castro. Then, following the earthquake of September 19, 2017, Graco and his wife were accused of seizing much-needed humanitarian aid destined for earthquake victims. By February, 2018, the man once considered a leading candidate for President of Mexico was the least popular governor in the country.

In a controversial move, Graco chose his stepson, Rodrigo Gayosso as PRD candidate for governor in 2018. Swept up in Andrés Manuel López Obrador's wave, Cuernavaca mayor Cuauhtémoc Blanco of the Juntos Haremos Historia (Together we will make history) coalition won the election.

Criminal accusations
On February 13, 2019, Cuauhtemoc Blanco formally accused Graco Ramirez; his wife, Elena Cepeda; his stepson, Rodrigo Gayosso; and a notary public, Javier Barona; for the crimes of organized crime, operations with resources of illicit origin, and tax fraud. On September 27, 2019, the government of the state of Morelos formally solicited a political trial against Ramirez due to his refusal to provide the Attorney General and the Electoral Commission sufficient funds with which to operate. Although the Electoral Commission requested MXN $35 million for the 2018 election, Ramirez provided on MXN $18 million. El Universal reports that Ramirez is being investigated for deviating funds of MXN $100 million related to concerts by Sting, Emmanuel, and Mijares. There are receipts that show Sting was paid USD $2,000,000 for a concert, but he had been paid on USD $900,000 for a similar concert in Viña del Mar, Chile.

Blanco alleged in September 2020 that he had proof that Graco and Alberto Capella Ibarra had an agreement with organized crime while Ramírez Garrido Abreu was governor.

See also
List of people from Morelos, Mexico

References

External links
Official website

Living people
Party of the Democratic Revolution politicians
Members of the Chamber of Deputies (Mexico)
Members of the Senate of the Republic (Mexico)
People from Cuernavaca
People from Morelos
Governors of Morelos
Politicians from Morelos
Politicians from Tabasco
People from Villahermosa
1949 births
Institutional Revolutionary Party politicians
Mexican Communist Party politicians
Socialist Mexican Party politicians
20th-century Mexican politicians
21st-century Mexican politicians
National Autonomous University of Mexico alumni